ISQ may refer to:

 ICMP source quench, a type of messages in Internet Control Message Protocol (ICMP)
 Implant stability quotient
 Independent Schools Queensland, an association with which Brisbane Grammar School is affiliated
 Industrial Skills Qualification, post-secondary vocational qualification in Brunei
 International School of Qingdao, part of the Qingdao MTI International School
 International Studies Quarterly, a political science journal
 International System of Quantities
 IATA/FAA code of Schoolcraft County Airport, an airport in Michigan's Upper Peninsula